TRNA (guanine26-N2/guanine27-N2)-dimethyltransferase (Trm1, tRNA (N2,N2-guanine)-dimethyltransferase, tRNA (m2(2G26) methyltransferase, Trm1[tRNA (m2(2)G26) methyltransferase]) is an enzyme with systematic name S-adenosyl-L-methionine:tRNA (guanine26-N2/guanine27-N2)-dimethyltransferase. This enzyme catalyses the following chemical reaction

 4 S-adenosyl-L-methionine + guanine26/guanine27 in tRNA  4 S-adenosyl-L-homocysteine + N2-dimethylguanine26/N2-dimethylguanine27 in tRNA

The enzyme from Aquifex aeolicus is similar to the TRM1 methyltransferases of archaea and eukarya.

References

External links 
 

EC 2.1.1